Lucille Farrier Stickel (January 11, 1915 – February 22, 2007) was an American wildlife toxicologist and director of the Patuxent Wildlife Research Center from 1972 to 1982. Her research focused extensively on contaminants in wildlife ecosystems, and her research on the effects of the pesticide DDT helped form the basis for Rachel Carson's book Silent Spring. She was also the first woman to become both a senior scientist as a civil servant of the US government and to be director for a national research laboratory.

Early life and education

Childhood & family 
Elizabeth Lucille Farrier Stickel, known by her close peers as Lucille, was born on January 11, 1915 in Hillman, Michigan. As a child, she had a calling for nature. She acquired this love for the environment by allotting most of her free time to outdoor activities including swimming and climbing. She was reported to have climbed to the rooftops of almost all the homes in her small town. She expanded her love for nature as she spent many of her summers at her family cottage on Lake Avalon, close to her hometown, as well as trips to Florida during the winter with her family.

Education 
In the 1920s, Lucille attended Roosevelt High School, a local public school, where she excelled in academics. She was also involved in the girl scouts and high school sports. She was a young, enthusiastic adventurer with a drive for her education. As she approached college, she began to further her career as a scientist.

Lucille Stickel obtained her Bachelor of Science from Eastern Michigan University in 1936, graduating as a member of Phi Beta Kappa. She went to the University of Michigan for both her master's degree and Ph.D and acquired them in 1938 and 1949, respectively.

Career 
The first major publication Stickel made was an environment report in 1946, the first of a number of reports she would make on the ecological effects of the pesticide DDT. She wrote the chapter, "Pesticide Residues in Birds and Mammals," in the book series, Environmental Science Research. In this chapter, she discussed the chemical effects that pesticides that include organochlorine had on birds and mammals. These reports, among the rest of her body of work, helped lead to the creation of wildlife toxicology as a field of study, as the impacts could affect not just wildlife on land, but also in rivers and in the soil. She first joined the Patuxent Wildlife Research Center in 1942 after obtaining her bachelor's degree. Several years later, she took time off in order to accomplish her Ph.D., before returning to work at Patuxent in 1961, which led to her being named director of the facility in 1972. Stickel retained the position for a decade before retiring in 1982.

Accolades 
Stickel was presented the Federal Women's Award by the Department of the Interior in 1968, along with a Distinguished Service Award in 1973. The Wildlife Society awarded Stickel the Aldo Leopold Memorial Award in 1974 for her work on wildlife conservation. The Society of Environmental Toxicology and Chemistry bestowed her with the Rachel Carson Award in 1998. Stickel was also inducted into the Michigan Women's Hall of Fame in 2014 for her environmental work.

An honorary doctorate was accorded to Stickel by the Eastern Michigan University in 1974. In addition, the Patuxent Wildlife Research Center renamed a chemistry and physiology lab after her and her husband.

Personal life 
She was married to William Henson Stickel, also a member of the US Fish and Wildlife Service and a herpetologist. She died on February 22, 2007, in Asheville, North Carolina.

References 

1915 births
2007 deaths
Women zoologists
American conservationists
Eastern Michigan University alumni
University of Michigan alumni
20th-century American zoologists
American toxicologists
American women chemists
People from Hillman, Michigan
Recipients of the Department of the Interior's Distinguished Service Award
20th-century American women scientists